The Reinhart Collection formed by Oskar Reinhart is now held in a museum in his old house, "Am Römerholz" in Winterthur, Zurich Canton, Switzerland, as well as the Museum Oskar Reinhart in the centre of Winterthur.  It belongs to the Swiss Confederation, Federal Office of Culture (Bundesamt für Kultur, Bern).

The collection owns paintings by artists including Pierre-Auguste Renoir, Édouard Manet, Paul Cézanne, Eugène Delacroix, Théodore Géricault, Camille Corot, Honoré Daumier, Jean-François Millet, Gustave Courbet, Edgar Degas, Camille Pissarro, Alfred Sisley, Matthias Grünewald, Lukas Cranach, Vincent van Gogh (two paintings of the Hospital in Arles - ward and garden) and Pieter Breughel the Elder (The Adoration of the Magi in the Snow).

The villa is building of 1915, designed by Maurice Turrettini.

Gallery

References

Sources

https://web.archive.org/web/20110726220452/http://www.insecula.com/musee/M0223.html
http://www.roemerholz.ch

Art museums and galleries in Switzerland
Winterthur
Buildings and structures completed in 1915
Museums in the canton of Zürich
Museums established in 1915
Former private collections
20th-century architecture in Switzerland